4x Mixed Relay Triathlon was part of the triathlon at the 2014 Summer Youth Olympics programme. It was held on 21 August 2014 at Xuanwu Lake. The teams were made based on the results of the boys' and girls' triathlon event held of 17–18 August 2014. Each team had two boys and two girls and were split by continent. A total of 16 teams raced in the event.

Medalists

Results 
The race began at approximately 9:00 a.m. (UTC+8) on 21 August at Xuanwu Lake.

Note: No one is allotted the number 13.
Note: Teams Oceania 1, World Team 1, World Team 2 and America 3 received a 10 seconds penalty

References 

Triathlon at the 2014 Summer Youth Olympics
Triathlon 2014